Pesi Girsch (1954) is a German-born Israeli photographer.

Biography 
Pesi Girsch was born in Munich, Germany to Holocaust survivors. In 1968, she immigrated to Israel with her mother and four siblings. She studied sculpture with Rudi Lehmann. After serving in the army, she studied drawing with Yosef Schwartzman and traveled to Germany to continue her studies. In 1977, she moved to Zaire, Africa with her husband. Two years later, she resettled in Tel Aviv-Yafo.

Art career
In the 1980s, she abandoned sculpture, studying photography and education at the Midrasha Le'Omanut. 
Among her best-known work is the photography series "Glory to the Photographer's Model" (1991) in which she shows staged portraits of figures in the water with ritualistic overtones. In Natures Mortes from the early 2000s, Girsch shows still life using the corpses of dead animals. Stark, symmetrical compositions and lyrical lighting invest the photographs with symbolic meaning.

Education
 1969-74 Sculpture with Rudi Lehmann
 1972-74 drawing with Yosef Schwartzman, Tel Aviv
 1974-77 Sculpture, Academy of Fine Arts, Munich, Germany
 1982-87 Photography, Art Teachers College, Ramat Hasharon
 1982-87 Meisterschule of Kathe Kollwitz, Tel Aviv

Teaching
 From 1986 WIZO France School, Tel Aviv, Photography
 From 1992 Haifa University, Creative Art Group

Awards and recognition
 1988 The America-Israel Cultural Fund Scholarship 
 1988 Gerard Levy Prize for a Young Photographer, Israel Museum, Jerusalem
 1989 Prize for a Young Artist, Ministry of Education
 1995 Grant from German Academy, Berlin, for Exchange of Artists
 1999 Hadassah and Raphael Klatchkin Grant for Art, America-Israel Cultural Foundation
 2001 Eli Oshorov Prize for an Outstanding Artist; Painter and Sculptors Association, Tel Aviv
 2001 Prize, Ministry of Education and Culture

References

External links 
 
 
 

Israeli artists
1954 births
Academic staff of Bezalel Academy of Arts and Design
German emigrants to Israel
20th-century German Jews
Jewish Israeli artists
Living people